Frane Ikić (born 19 June 1994) is a Croatian professional footballer who plays as a centre-back for Bosnian Premier League club Velež Mostar.

Club career
Ikić made his professional debut for Zadar on 17 November 2012, coming on as a substitute. In his first three seasons with Zadar in the 1. HNL he scored 2 goals in 44 appearances. On 15 July 2015, he signed a two-year contract with Rijeka, with the possibility of an additional two-year extension.

On 19 January 2017, Ikić joined Slovenian PrvaLiga club Koper. After appearing in just one match for Koper, Ikić left the club and joined Cibalia. After Cibalia, he returned to and had a brief spell at Zadar. In summer 2019, he returned to Slovenia and joined Fužinar.

On 1 February 2020, Ikić signed a six month contract with a possibility of an extension with Bosnian Premier League club Željezničar. He made his official debut for Željezničar in a 3–0 win against Zvijezda 09 on 29 February 2020. On 6 June 2020, Ikić extended his contract with Željezničar, which is due to last until June 2021. Ikić scored his first goal for Željezničar on 28 October 2020, in a league match against Zrinjski Mostar. He left Željezničar in June 2021.

International career
Ikić represented Croatia at various youth levels between 2013 and 2015.

Honours
Rijeka
1. HNL runner-up: 2015–16

Željezničar
Bosnian Premier League runner-up: 2019–20

References

External links

Frane Ikić at Sofascore

1994 births
Living people
Sportspeople from Zadar
Association football central defenders
Croatian footballers
Croatia youth international footballers
Croatia under-21 international footballers
NK Zadar players
HNK Rijeka players
HNK Rijeka II players
FC Koper players
HNK Cibalia players
NK Fužinar players
FK Željezničar Sarajevo players
Gyirmót FC Győr players
FK Velež Mostar players
Croatian Football League players
First Football League (Croatia) players
Slovenian PrvaLiga players
Slovenian Second League players
Premier League of Bosnia and Herzegovina players
Nemzeti Bajnokság I players
Croatian expatriate footballers
Expatriate footballers in Slovenia
Croatian expatriate sportspeople in Slovenia
Expatriate footballers in Bosnia and Herzegovina
Croatian expatriate sportspeople in Bosnia and Herzegovina
Expatriate footballers in Hungary
Croatian expatriate sportspeople in Hungary